Venerable Gabriel of Lesnovo was a Bulgarian hermit and saint, companion of Saint John of Rila and Prohor of Pčinja. All three are venerated in Bulgaria, North Macedonia and Serbia. St. Gabriel's feast is January 15.

Biography
According to the Life of Saint Gabriel of Lesnovo, written during the twelfth century, he was a hermit in the tradition of Saint John of Rila. He was born in the latter part of the eleventh century in the village of Osiče, near Kriva Palanka. Today it is in North Macedonia, but at that time the area was part of the Byzantine Empire, included in a province named Bulgaria. According to other sources he was born in the early 11th century, when the area was still part of the First Bulgarian Empire. His decision to leave the world and remain pure squares well with the great religious awakening that was reverberating throughout Christian Europe in the eleventh and twelfth centuries.

Gabriel lived a life of asceticism in the eleventh century Kratovo on Mt. Osogovo, where he built a church dedicated to the Holy Archangel Michael. Several other monks joined him, and this was the advent of the Lesnovo monastery. It remains still unsolved whether Gabriel founded a monastery or whether it was founded on the spot close to his hermitage. Very little is known of this original monastery and the first and only mention of the old monastery comes only from 1330 in a chronicle by its monk Stanislav, a famous writer. During the reign of Emperor Ivan Asen II (r. 1218–1241) the relics of the saint were transferred from the monastery to the then capital of Bulgaria — Tarnovo, and placed at the Church of St. Apostles on Trapezitsa. After the Ottoman invasion of Bulgaria at the end of the 14th century, the traces of the holy relics of Saint Gabriel were lost.

The church located at the present-day monastery was built by Despot Jovan Oliver, a nobleman under the Emperor Stefan Dušan (r. 1331–1355). St. Gabriel died in the Lord toward the end of the eleventh century.

See also
 Byzantine Bulgaria
 List of Serbian saints

References

Sources 
 

Medieval Bulgarian saints
Bulgarian Orthodox Church
Serbian Orthodox Church
11th-century Bulgarian people
11th-century Christian monks
11th-century Byzantine monks